The Gallops is a stop on the Luas light-rail tram system in Dún Laoghaire - Rathdown, south of Dublin, Ireland. It opened in 2010 as a stop on the extension of the Green Line south from Sandyford to Brides Glen.  The stop provides access to the nearby village of Stepaside. The stop is named for the nearby housing estate (built in the 1990s), which is named for its location near Leopardstown Racecourse.

Location and access
The stop is located at the side of Ballyogan Road. To the south of the stop, the line continues in a section of reserved track next to the road.  To the north, the track curves along Murphystown Way.

References

Luas Green Line stops in Dún Laoghaire–Rathdown
Railway stations opened in 2010
2010 establishments in Ireland
Railway stations in the Republic of Ireland opened in the 21st century